The Kaiser class was a class of five dreadnought battleships that were built in Germany prior to World War I and served in the  (Imperial Navy) during the war. They were the third class of German dreadnoughts, and the first to feature turbine engines and superfiring turrets. As was usual for German battleships of the period, the Kaiser class mounted main guns that were smaller than those of their British rivals: , compared to the  guns of the British .

All five ships saw action in the North Sea during the war; they served together as VI Division of III Battle Squadron. Four were present during the Battle of Jutland; König Albert was in dock at the time. Of the four ships that took part in the battle, only Kaiser was damaged, being struck by two heavy-caliber shells. The ships also took part in Operation Albion in the Baltic Sea; during the operation they were reorganized as IV Battle Squadron, under the command of Vice Admiral Wilhelm Souchon.

At the end of the war, all five ships were interned at the British naval base in Scapa Flow. On 21 June 1919, they were scuttled to prevent their seizure by the Royal Navy. The ships were subsequently raised and broken up for scrap between 1929 and 1937.

Design 
The Kaiser-class ships were ordered under the same Second Naval Law as the preceding Helgoland-class battleships. The law provided that the life expectancy of capital ships was to be reduced from 25 to 20 years, a measure designed to necessitate construction of newer battleships. This meant the six s, the two s, as well as the four s would have to be replaced.

General characteristics 
The ships had a double bottom for 88 percent of the length of the hull and 17 watertight compartments. The ships had a crew of 41 officers and 1,043 seamen. While serving as squadron flagship, the ships had an additional 14 officers and 80 men, and as the second command flagship, the ships' usual complement was augmented by another 2 officers and 23 men.

The Kaiser-class ships were excellent sea boats, but were very stiff, suffering a slight loss of speed in heavy swells. They were responsive to commands from the helm; they turned quickly initially, but suffered from severe torque at a hard rudder. With the rudder hard over, the ships would lose up to 66 percent of their speed and heel over as much as 8 degrees.

Propulsion 
The Kaiser-class ships were the first German battleships to be powered by turbines. They used turbines from several different manufacturers as the Reichsmarineamt and German shipyards attempted to find an alternative to a Parsons turbine monopoly. Nevertheless, Kaiser and Kaiserin were both equipped with three sets of Parsons turbines. Friedrich der Grosse had three sets of AEG-Curtis turbines, while König Albert was powered by Schichau turbines. The ships had two rudders.

Prinzregent Luitpold was equipped with two sets of Parsons turbines on the outer shafts. It was intended that a single 12,000 bhp Germania 6-cylinder 2-stroke diesel engine would drive the center shaft. However, the diesel power plant was not ready in time to be installed in Prinzregent Luitpold, so the ship sailed with only two shafts. On trials, Prinzregent Luitpold was approximately one half knot slower than her sisters.

Steam was provided by 16 Schulz-Thornycroft water-tube boilers, except in Prinzregent Luitpold, which had only 14 boilers. Hollow grates were fitted to the boilers between 1916 and 1917. Prinzregent Luitpold carried a reduced bunkerage—3,200 metric tons—but was designed to carry 400 tons of oil for the diesel engine. On diesel power alone, Prinzregent Luitpold would have had a range of 2,000 nautical miles at 12 knots.

Electrical power was provided by four double turbo-generators and two diesel generators. They produced a total output of 1,800 kilowatts at 225 volts.

Armament 

The Kaiser-class ships each carried ten  SK L/50 guns mounted in five twin turrets. One turret was mounted fore, two were mounted en echelon amidships, and the fourth and fifth turrets were mounted in a superfiring pair aft. The guns were supplied with a total of 860 shells, for 86 rounds per gun. The guns were placed in Drh LC/1909 mountings, which were very similar to the older LC/1908 gun mounts used in the preceding Helgoland-class ships. The mountings were initially capable of depression to −8 degrees and elevation to 13.5 degrees. The mountings were later modified to depress to −5.5 degrees and elevate to 16 degrees.

The ships had a secondary battery of fourteen  SK L/45 quick-firing guns, each mounted in casemates. The guns each had a supply of one hundred and sixty  shells, for a total of 2240. The ships were also equipped with eight  SK L/45 guns. They were eventually rearmed with four 8.8 cm L/45 Flak guns, two of which were later removed. As was customary for capital ships of the period, the Kaiser-class ships were armed with five  submerged torpedo tubes. One was mounted in the bow, while the other four were placed on the broadside, two on each flank of the ship.

Armor 

As with all major contemporary German warships, the Kaiser-class ships were protected by Krupp cemented steel armor. Behind the armored belt, the ships had a torpedo bulkhead 4 cm (1.6 in) thick.

Construction 
, the name ship of the class, was laid down at the Kaiserliche Werft Kiel in December 1909 under construction number 35. The ship was launched on 22 March 1911, and commissioned into the High Seas Fleet on 1 August 1912.  followed on 26 January 1910, at the AG Vulcan shipyard in Hamburg. She was launched on 10 June 1911 and commissioned as the flagship of the High Seas Fleet on 15 October 1912. , the third ship of the class, was laid down in the Howaldtswerke in Kiel in November 1910. She was launched on 11 November 1911, and commissioned on 14 May 1913.

 was laid down at Schichau in Danzig on 17 July 1910, and launched on 27 April 1912. She was commissioned into the fleet on 31 July 1913. , the last ship of the class, was laid down in January 1911 at the Germaniawerft shipyard in Kiel. The ship was launched on 17 February 1912 and commissioned on 19 August 1913.

Ships

Service history

Pre-war 
In 1913–1914 two Kaiser-class ships, Kaiser and König Albert took part in a major overseas tour to South America and South Africa. The cruise was designed to demonstrate German power projection, as well as to test the reliability of the new turbine engines on long-range operations. Both ships had returned to the German bases in the North Sea by the outbreak of World War I.

World War I

Raid on Scarborough, Hartlepool and Whitby 

The first major operation of the war in which the Kaiser-class ships participated was the raid on Scarborough, Hartlepool and Whitby on 15–16 December 1914. The raid was primarily conducted by the battlecruisers of the I Scouting Group. Friedrich von Ingenohl, the commander of the High Seas Fleet, decided to take up station approximately in the center of the North Sea, about 130 miles east of Scarborough.

The Royal Navy, which had recently received the German code books captured from the beached cruiser , was aware that an operation was taking place, but uncertain as to where the Germans would strike. Therefore, the Admiralty ordered David Beatty's 1st Battlecruiser Squadron, the six battleships of the 2nd Battle Squadron, and a number of cruisers and destroyers to attempt to intercept the German battlecruisers. However, Beatty's task force nearly ran headlong into the entire High Seas Fleet. At 6:20, Beatty's destroyer screen came into contact with the German torpedo boat V155. This began a confused 2-hour battle between the British destroyers and the German cruiser and destroyer screen, frequently at very close range. At the time of the first encounter, the Kaiser-class battleships were less than 10 miles away from the 6 British dreadnoughts; this was well within firing range, but in the darkness, neither British nor German admiral were aware of the composition of their opponents' fleets. Admiral Ingenohl, loathe to disobey the Kaiser's order to not risk the battlefleet without his express approval, concluded that his forces were engaging the screen of the entire Grand Fleet, and so 10 minutes after the first contact, he ordered a turn to port on a south-east course. Continued attacks delayed the turn, but by 6:42, it had been carried out. For about 40 minutes, the two fleets were steaming on a parallel course. At 7:20, Ingenohl ordered a further turn to port, which put his ships on a course for German waters.

Bombardment of Yarmouth and Lowestoft 

The Kaiser-class ships took part in another raid on the English coast, again as support for the German battlecruiser force in I Scouting Group. The battlecruisers left the Jade Estuary at 10:55 on 24 April 1916, and the rest of the High Seas Fleet followed at 13:40. The battlecruiser  struck a mine while en route to the target, and had to withdraw. The other battlecruisers bombarded the town of Lowestoft largely without incident, but during the approach to Yarmouth, they encountered the British cruisers of the Harwich Force. A short artillery duel ensued before the Harwich Force withdrew. Reports of British submarines in the area prompted the retreat of I Scouting Group. At this point, Admiral Reinhard Scheer, who had been warned of the sortie of the Grand Fleet from its base in Scapa Flow, also withdrew to safer German waters.

Battle of Jutland 

Four of the ships participated in the fleet sortie that resulted in the battle of Jutland on 31 May–1 June 1916. The operation was a repeat of earlier plans that intended to draw out a portion of the Grand Fleet and destroy it. Kaiser, Kaiserin, Prinzregent Luitpold, and Friedrich der Grosse, Scheer's flagship, made up VI Division of III Battle Squadron. III Battle Squadron was the first of three battleship units; however, the König-class battleships of V Division, III Battle Squadron were the vanguard of the fleet. Directly astern of the Kaiser-class ships were the Helgoland and Nassau-class battleships of I Battle Squadron; in the rear guard were the elderly  pre-dreadnoughts of II Battle Squadron.

Shortly before 16:00 CET, the battlecruisers of I Scouting Group encountered the British 1st Battlecruiser Squadron, under the command of David Beatty. By this time, the German battlecruisers were steaming south in order to draw the British ships towards the main body of the High Seas Fleet. At 17:30, the leading German battleship, spotted both I Scouting Group and the 1st Battlecruiser Squadron approaching. The German battlecruisers were steaming down to starboard, while the British ships steamed to port. At 17:45, Scheer ordered a two-point turn to port to bring his ships closer to the British battlecruisers. Shortly thereafter the order was given to commence firing; the Kaiser-class ships, with the exception of Prinzregent Luitpold, were not yet within range to engage the British battlecruisers. Prinzregent Luitpold managed to fire eight salvos at 22,300–21,300 yards (20,400–19,500 m) before the range again widened sufficiently to prevent further firing. In the meantime, Kaiser and Friedrich der Grosse, along with the battleships of II Battle Squadron, were within range of the British 2nd Light Cruiser Squadron. However, the massed fire from the ten battleships interfered with accurate spotting, and after only a few salvos fire was largely ceased.

At around 19:00, the cruiser , which had earlier been disabled, was coming under attack from British light forces, and so Scheer ordered his ships to turn in order to cover an attempt to bring the ship under tow. At 19:05, the British armored cruisers  and  began firing on the crippled Wiesbaden. However, by 19:15, Hipper's battlecruisers and the battleships of III Battle Squadron appeared on the scene, and began to hammer the British ships at a range of less than 8,000 yards. Kaiser and three König-class battleships concentrated their fire on the two cruisers until one of Defences magazines was detonated, which caused a massive explosion that destroyed the ship. Warrior, badly damaged and afire, managed to limp northward towards the s of the 5th Battle Squadron.

While Warrior was retreating northward under the cover of her own smoke, the battleship  came too close to her sister , and had to turn to starboard in order to avoid collision. At that moment, a shell from Kaiser struck Warspites steering gear and jammed them, temporarily leaving the ship only able to steam in a large circle. Friedrich der Grosse, König, two Nassau and three Helgoland-class battleships fired on Warspite for a period of about 20 minutes; Warspite was hit 11 times before the Germans lost sight of her. Because her steering gear could not be adequately repaired, Warspite was forced to withdraw from the battle; her absence prompted the Germans to believe they had sunk her.

Kaiser, Kaiserin, and Prinzregent Luitpold, largely undamaged during the battle, took up defensive positions outside the Wilhelmshaven locks. The other capital ships—those that were still in fighting condition—had their fuel and ammunition stocks replenished.

During the battle, Kaiser had fired 224 heavy battery and 41 secondary battery shells; Kaiserin fired 160 and 135 respectively, Prinzregent Luitpold fired 169 and 106 respectively, and Friedrich der Grosse fired 72 and 151 shells, respectively. Kaiser was hit twice by heavy-caliber shells during the battle, the only ship of the class to have been hit; however the ship suffered only a single wounded casualty.

Operation Albion 

In early September 1917, following the German conquest of the Russian port of Riga, the German navy decided to expunge the Russian naval forces that still held the Gulf of Riga. To this end, the Admiralstab (the Navy High Command) planned an operation in the Moonsund archipelago, particularly targeting the Russian gun batteries on the Sworbe peninsula of Ösel. On 18 September, the order was issued for a joint Army-Navy operation to capture Ösel and Moon islands; the primary naval component was to comprise the flagship, Moltke, along with III Battle Squadron of the High Seas Fleet. V Division included the four Königs, and was by this time augmented with the new battleship . VI Division consisted of the five Kaiser-class battleships. Along with nine light cruisers, three torpedo boat flotillas, and dozens of mine warfare ships, the entire force numbered some 300 ships, and was supported by over 100 aircraft and six zeppelins. The invasion force amounted to approximately 24,600 officers and enlisted men. Opposing the Germans were the old Russian pre-dreadnoughts Slava and Tsarevitch, the armored cruisers Bayan, Admiral Makarov, and Diana, 26 destroyers, several torpedo boats and gunboats, and a garrison on Ösel of some 14,000 men with shore batteries.

The operation began on 12 October, when the Kaiser-class battleships engaged the batteries on the Sworbe peninsula. Simultaneously, Moltke, Bayern, and the Königs began firing on the Russian shore batteries at Tagga Bay. Stiff Russian resistance in the Kassar Wick, the entrance to Moon Sound, slowed the German advance. On 14 October, Kaiser was detached from the bombardment force to deal with the Russian destroyers holding up the German minesweepers. Under the cover of Kaisers 30.5 cm guns, the German torpedo boats dashed into the Sound. During the ensuing clash, the Russian destroyer Grom was disabled and eventually sunk.

The Russian 30.5 cm shore batteries at Zerel remained a significant problem, and so while Kaiser was disrupting the Russian destroyers, Kaiserin, König Albert, and Friedrich der Grosse bombarded Zerel at ranges of between 7.5 and 12.5 miles. Russian counter-fire proved accurate, and so the German dreadnoughts were forced to continually alter course to avoid being hit. The attack lasted only about an hour, due to fears of mines and submarines. The following morning, two König-class battleships were sent into Moon Sound to destroy the Russian ships stationed there. König sank the pre-dreadnought Slava, while Kronprinz forced the withdrawal of the remaining warships. By 20 October, the naval operations were effectively over; the Russian ships had been destroyed or forced to withdraw, and the German army attained its objectives.

Fate 

Following the capitulation of Germany in November 1918, the High Seas Fleet, under the command of Rear Admiral Ludwig von Reuter, was interned in the British naval base in Scapa Flow. The fleet remained in captivity during the negotiations that ultimately produced the Versailles Treaty. It became apparent to Reuter that the British intended to seize the German ships on 21 June, which was the deadline for Germany to have signed the peace treaty. Unaware that the deadline had been extended to the 23rd, Reuter ordered his ships be sunk. On the morning of 21 June, the British fleet left Scapa Flow to conduct training maneuvers; at 10:00 Reuter transmitted the order to his ships.

Friedrich der Grosse was the first ship of the fleet to be scuttled, sinking at 12:16. She was raised on 29 April 1937 and towed to Rosyth for scrapping. The ship's bell was returned to Germany in 1965, and is currently in the Fleet Headquarters in Glücksburg. König Albert followed at 12:54, the second ship of the fleet to sink. The ship was later raised on 31 July 1935 and broken up in Rosyth over the following year. Kaiser sank at 13:25, and was raised for scrapping on 20 March 1929; breaking work was conducted in Rosyth by 1930. Prinzregent Luitpold sank five minutes later, at 13:30. She too was raised, on 9 July 1931, and broken up in Rosyth. Kaiserin, the last ship of the class to be sunk, slipped beneath the surface at 14:00. She was raised on 14 May 1936, and broken up that year in Rosyth.

Footnotes

Notes

Citations

References

Further reading
 
 

Battleship classes
 
Kaiser class battleship